Yeoh is one spelling of the Hokkien pronunciation of the Chinese surname spelled in Mandarin Chinese Pinyin as Yáng (see that article for the history of the surname). Another common spelling is Yeo. Both the spellings Yeoh and Yeo are common in southeast Asia, for example among Malaysian Chinese.

People
Notable people with the surname Yeoh include:
 Benjamin Yeoh (born 1978), British playwright
Bernard Yeoh (born 1969), Malaysian sport shooter
Brenda Yeoh, Singaporean academic and geographer
 Cheryl Yeoh (born 1983), Malaysian entrepreneur in California
Dawn Yeoh (born 1986), Singaporean actress
Francis Yeoh (born 1954), Malaysian businessman, son of Yeoh Tiong Lay
Hannah Yeoh (born 1979), Malaysian politician
Joanne Yeoh (born 1977), Malaysian violinist
Melvin Yeoh (born 1981), Malaysian mixed martial artist
Michelle Yeoh, Malaysian businesswoman, granddaughter of Yeoh Tiong Lay
Michelle Yeoh (born 1962), Academy Award winner Malaysian actress
Nikki Yeoh (born 1973), British jazz pianist
 Rachel Yeoh, Malaysian businesswoman, granddaughter of Yeoh Tiong Lay
 Rebekah Yeoh, Malaysian businesswoman, granddaughter of Yeoh Tiong Lay
 Ruth Yeoh, Malaysian businesswoman, granddaughter of Yeoh Tiong Lay
 Yeoh Eng-kiong (born 1946), Malaysian politician
Yeoh Ghim Seng (1918–1993), Singaporean politician
Yeoh Kay Bin (born 1980), Malaysian badminton player
 Yeoh Kay Ee, Malaysian badminton player
 Yeoh Kean Thai (born 1966), Malaysian artist
Yeoh Ken Nee (born 1983), Malaysian diver
 Yeoh Li Tian (born 1999), Malaysian chess player
 Yeoh Tiong Lay (1929–2017), Malaysian businessman who founded YTL Corporation

Fictional characters
 Alysia Yeoh, Batgirl character introduced in 2011

See also
 Yeoh (hyperelastic model): a material model for rubbers named after O.H. Yeoh
 Yeo, surname

References

Chinese-language surnames
Hokkien-language surnames